The Shire of Bannockburn was a local government area about  west-southwest of Melbourne, the state capital of Victoria, Australia.

History

Bannockburn was first incorporated as a road district on 31 October 1862, and became a shire on 30 June 1864. On 15 September 1915, it annexed the Shire of Meredith, which had been created on 30 June 1863, and became a shire on 28 April 1871. Parts of the shire's Steiglitz Riding were severed and annexed to the Shire of Corio's Lara Riding on 31 May 1916.

On 6 May 1994, the Shire of Bannockburn was abolished, and along with the Shires of Grenville and Leigh, and parts of the Shire of Buninyong, was merged into the newly created Golden Plains Shire.

Wards

The Shire of Bannockburn was divided into four ridings, each of which elected three councillors:
 Bannockburn Riding
 Barwon Riding
 Meredith Riding
 Moorabool Riding

Towns and localities
 Bamganie
 Bannockburn*
 Batesford
 Durdidwarrah
 Fyansford
 Gheringhap
 Inverleigh
 Lethbridge
 Maude
 Meredith
 Murgheboluc
 Russells Bridge
 Sheoaks
 Steiglitz
 Stonehaven
 Sutherlands Creek
 Woodburn Creek

* Council seat.

Population

* Estimate in 1958 Victorian Year Book.

References

External links
 Victorian Places - Bannockburn Shire

Bannockburn
1862 establishments in Australia